Ľubomír Kolník (born January 23, 1968 in Nitra, Czechoslovakia) is a Slovak former professional ice hockey player.

Career
Kolník began his career with HC Dukla Trenčín in the Czechoslovak Extraliga. Kolník was drafted 116th overall in the 1990 NHL Entry Draft by the New Jersey Devils but never played in the NHL. In 1992, he moved to Finland and played for Jokipojat of the I divisioona and eventually moved to Lukko in the SM-liiga. He returned to Dukla Trenčín in 1994 for one season before returning to the SM-liiga for Kiekko-Espoo.

Kolník returned to Slovakia in 1996 and signed with HC Slovan Bratislava and remained until 2001 when he joined HK Ardo Nitra. After one season he moved to HKm Zvolen, but left again after one season and returned to Nitra. He signed for HK 36 Skalica in 2008.

Kolník represented Czechoslovakia in the 1991 World Ice Hockey Championship. He then represented Slovakia following the dissolution of Czechoslovakia and played in five World Championships.  He also played in the 1994 and 1998 Winter Olympics.

Career statistics

Regular season and playoffs

International

External links

1968 births
Living people
Czechoslovak ice hockey right wingers
Espoo Blues players
HK Dukla Trenčín players
HC Slovan Bratislava players
Ice hockey players at the 1994 Winter Olympics
Ice hockey players at the 1998 Winter Olympics
Jokipojat players
Lukko players
New Jersey Devils draft picks
HK Nitra players
HC Nové Zámky players
Olympic ice hockey players of Slovakia
HK 36 Skalica players
Slovak ice hockey right wingers
Sportspeople from Nitra
HKM Zvolen players
Slovak expatriate ice hockey players in Finland